Amparo Ramos Correa (December 30, 1944 – March 15, 2004) was a popular Colombian dancer famous as a celebrity in the Feria de Cali and as a dancer for several popular Latin musicians. She was nicknamed "Amparo Arrebato" (Arrebato is Spanish for "rapture" or "fury") for her strong and furious way of dancing capable of rousing strong sentiments both in dancers and spectators.

Amparo was born in Cali, Colombia. As a student. she excelled in high-speed athletics and basketball. Later she became the most popular dancer of the annual Santiago de Cali Fair.

Her prominence as dancer began in the 1960s, thanks to recognition of Dámaso Pérez Prado, "The King of Mambo", who invited her to join to his dance group.

Afterwards, the Puerto Rican salsa duo Richie Ray & Bobby Cruz increased her fame when they released their 1970 album Agúzate containing the well-known tune "Amparo Arrebato", composed in honor of the then 23-year-old dancer.

Amparo died of a heart attack at a hospital in Cali at the age of 59.

References

External links

YouTube - Amparo Arrebato, performed by Richie Ray and Bobby Cruz

1944 births
2004 deaths
Colombian female dancers
Colombian women
People from Cali
Salsa dancers
Tango dancers